The Torch Triple X (or XXX) was a UNIX workstation computer produced by the British company Torch Computers, and launched in 1985. It was based on the Motorola 68010 microprocessor and ran a version of UNIX System V.

Hardware 

The Triple X was based on an 8 MHz 68010 CPU, with a Hitachi 6303 "service processor". The CPU was accompanied by a 68451 memory management unit and a 68450 DMA controller. Both VMEbus and a BBC Micro-compatible "1MHz bus" expansion buses were provided, as was a SCSI host adapter, and an optional Ethernet interface. Both RS-423 and X.25-compatible synchronous serial ports were provided. This latter feature made the Triple X attractive to the UK academic community, where X.25 networks were prevalent at the time.

Standard RAM capacity was 1 MB, expandable to 7 MB via VME cards. A 720 kB, 5.25 in floppy disk drive and ST-506-compatible 20 MB hard disk were fitted as standard, interfaced to the SCSI bus via an OMTI adapter.

Either a 10 or 13 inch colour monitor was supplied. Two graphics modes were available: 720 × 256 pixels in four colours, or 720 × 512 in two colours.

The Triple X had a novel touch-sensitive "soft" power switch. When switching off, this commanded the operating system to shut down gracefully before powering down.

Software 

The Triple X's firmware was called Caretaker. The native operating system was  Uniplus+ UNIX System V Release 2. A graphical user interface called OpenTop was also included as standard.

Quad X 

The Quad X was an enhanced version of the Triple X, with a 68020 processor and three VME expansion slots.  This was produced only in small numbers before Torch became insolvent.

References

Bibliography

Computer workstations
68k-based computers
32-bit computers
Computers designed in the United Kingdom